Lorena Gabriela Ostase (born 25 July 1997) is a Romanian handballer for Rapid București and the Romanian national team.

She represented Romania at the 2019 World Women's Handball Championship and at the 2021 World Women's Handball Championship.

International honours 
IHF Youth World Championship:
Gold Medalist: 2014
IHF Junior World Championship:
Bronze Medalist: 2016

Awards and recognition
All-Star Pivot of the IHF Youth World Championship: 2014 
 Vaslui County Sportswoman of the Year Award: 2014

References

External links

 

1997 births
Living people
Sportspeople from Vaslui
Romanian female handball players